Jabez Warner Fitch (May 1823 – April 5, 1884) was an American politician who served as the 14th lieutenant governor of Ohio from 1878 to 1880 under Governor Richard M. Bishop. He was a Democrat from Cuyahoga County.

Biography

Jabez Fitch was born in 1823, and moved to Cuyahoga County, Ohio in 1826. His father was Guerdon Fitch, a well known citizen. He attended common schools, and entered the Cleveland law offices of Bolton & Kelly, where he worked and studied law.  He was married to Mary J. Doleman.

Career
In 1846, he was admitted to the bar, and was appointed city solicitor. When Franklin Pierce was elected, Fitch was appointed United States Marshall for the Northern District of Ohio. He was city councilman in 1851 He was a longtime member of the volunteer fire department, and was elected chief in 1852. During the United States Civil War, Fitch was general of volunteers, in charge of Camp Taylor in Cleveland. Regiments were sent out under other commanders, so Fitch volunteered as private in the 19th Ohio Infantry under General Beatty, who appointed him quartermaster. After the war, he returned to real estate interests in Cleveland, and, in 1877 he was elected lieutenant governor of Ohio on a Democratic Party ticket with Richard M. Bishop. He held no later offices, except trustee of the Northern Ohio Insane Asylum and United States jury commissioner.

Death
Jabez W. Fitch died in Cleveland on April 5, 1884, ten years after his wife. He left no children.

References

External links
 

Lieutenant Governors of Ohio
Ohio Democrats
Politicians from Cleveland
1823 births
1884 deaths
People of Ohio in the American Civil War
Ohio lawyers
Cleveland City Council members
United States Marshals
19th-century American politicians
Lawyers from Cleveland
Burials at Erie Street Cemetery
19th-century American lawyers